PROP can stand for:
 6-N-Propylthiouracil (or PROP), a thionamide either tasting very bitter or tasteless depending on genetic makeup
 PROP (category theory), a certain symmetric strict monoidal category, in category theory
 Propulsion Engineer (PROP), space shuttle flight control position
 Preservation of the Rights of Prisoners (PROP), a UK prisoner's rights organisation set up in the early 1970s

See also
 Prop (disambiguation)